Johann Bartl (born 31 July 1905, died between 1939 and 1945) was a Czech sprinter. He competed in the men's 100 metres at the 1928 Summer Olympics.

References

1905 births
Year of death missing
Athletes (track and field) at the 1928 Summer Olympics
Czech male sprinters
Olympic athletes of Czechoslovakia
Place of birth missing